Wenzhou railway station is a railway station in Lucheng District, Wenzhou, Zhejiang, China. It is the eastern terminus for passenger services on the Jinhua–Wenzhou railway. It opened with the line on 11 June 1998.

See also
Wenzhou South railway station
Wenzhou North railway station

References 

Railway stations in Zhejiang
Railway stations in China opened in 1998
Buildings and structures in Wenzhou
Transport in Wenzhou